Dumitru Dragomir (26 October 1884 – 20th century) was a Bessarabian and Romanian politician. He was a member of Sfatul Țării and voted the Union of Bessarabia with Romania on 27 March 1918.

Biography 
Dumitru Dragomir was born in Volintiri. He served as Member of the Moldovan Parliament (1917–1918).

Gallery

Bibliography 
Gheorghe E. Cojocaru, Sfatul Țării: itinerar, Civitas, Chişinău, 1998, 
Mihai Taşcă, Sfatul Țării şi actualele autorităţi locale, "Timpul de dimineaţă", no. 114 (849), June 27, 2008 (page 16)

External links 
 Biblio Polis - Vol. 25 (2008) Nr. 1 (Serie nouă)
 Arhiva pentru Sfatul Tarii
 Deputaţii Sfatului Ţării şi Lavrenti Beria

Notes

1884 births
20th-century deaths
People from Ștefan Vodă District
People from Akkermansky Uyezd
Moldovan MPs 1917–1918